Kevin Biondi (born 10 February 1999) is a professional Italian footballer who plays as midfielder for the  club Rimini on loan from Pordenone.

Career

Early career 
Kevin Biondi started playing football in the Catania youth sector. He made his debut in professional football on 25 August 2019, in the 6–3 away victory against Avellino. He made 27 appearances and 4 goals. In the 2020–21 season he made 20 appearances and scored one goal for Catania. On 1 February 2021, he signed a four and a half year contract for Pordenone. He made his debut in the 1–2 home defeat on 6 February 2021 against Vicenza. On 31 August 2021, Biondi returned to Catania on loan. Catania went bankrupt during the season, and Biondi was allowed to return to Pordenone before the 2021–22 season ended. On 12 January 2023, Biondi joined Rimini on loan.

Style of play 
He has good running, technique, intensity and ability to score. He can play as full back, mezz'ala and attacking wing.

References

External links

1999 births
Living people
Italian footballers
Footballers from Catania
Footballers from Sicily
Association football midfielders
Catania S.S.D. players
Pordenone Calcio players
Rimini F.C. 1912 players
Serie B players
Serie C players